Torment is the eleventh studio album by experimental rock composer Zoogz Rift, released in December 1989 by SST Records.

Track listing

Personnel 
Adapted from the Torment liner notes.
 Zoogz Rift – vocals, guitar, percussion

Musicians
 Tom Brown – drums, percussion, additional vocals
 Richie Hass – vibraphone
 Willie Lapin – bass guitar, percussion, additional vocals
 Marc Mylar – clarinet, tenor saxophone
 Jonathan "Mako" Sharkey – synthesizer, percussion, additional vocals

Production and additional personnel
 John Golden – mastering

Release history

References

External links 
 Torment at iTunes
 

1989 albums
SST Records albums
Zoogz Rift albums